Inca Huagansa or Inka Waqanqa (quechua inka Inca, waqay to cry, -nqa a  suffix, "the Inca will cry", erroneously also spelled Inca Huagansa, a meaningless term) is a mountain in the Andes of Peru which reaches a height of approximately . It is located in the Ancash Region, Bolognesi Province, Cajacay District. It lies south of a place named Inca Huacanca (also quechua Inka Waqanqa).

References

Mountains of Peru
Mountains of Ancash Region